Sergey Dyomin (born 18 December 1943) is a Soviet athlete. He competed in the men's pole vault at the 1964 Summer Olympics.

References

1943 births
Living people
Athletes (track and field) at the 1964 Summer Olympics
Soviet male pole vaulters
Olympic athletes of the Soviet Union
Place of birth missing (living people)